This is a list of display servers.

X11 
Cygwin/X    
KDrive
Low Bandwidth X
MacX
Mir (display server)
MKS X/Server
Multi-Pointer X
Reflection X
RISCwindows
WiredX
X Window System
X-Win32
X.Org Server
X386
Xapollo
XDarwin
Xephyr
XFree86
Xming
Xmove
Xnest
Xnews (X11 server)
Xpra
XQuartz
Xsgi
Xsun
Xvfb
XWinLogon

Wayland 

1 A pivotal difference between Android and the other Linux kernel-based operating systems is the C standard library: Android's libbionic is different in that it does not aim to support POSIX to the same extent as the other libraries. With the help of libhybris it is possible to run Android-only software on other Linux kernel based operating systems, as long as this software does not depend on subsystems found only in the Android-forked Linux kernel, such as binder, pmem, ashmem, etc. Whether software programmed for Linux can run on Android, depends entirely on the extent to which libbionic matches the API of the glibc.

2  provides device detection via udev, device handling, input device event processing and abstraction.  also provides a generic X.Org input driver.  support was first merged in Weston 1.5. and is also used by Mutter.

Other 
DirectFB
Quartz Compositor
SPICE
SurfaceFlinger

See also 
 Display server
 Windowing system

References 

Display servers
Computer graphics
Communications protocols